Bellhouse Provincial Park is a provincial park in the southern Gulf Islands of British Columbia, Canada. It is located in the Sturdies Bay area of southeastern Galiano Island. It is on land donated by Thorney Bellhouse many in 1964, and is noted for its spring wild flowers, notably fawn lilies and chocolate lilies, as well as views of snow-capped mountains and abundant marine life.

External links

Provincial parks of British Columbia
Galiano Island